St. David's Parish was created as a civil parish in Prince County, Prince Edward Island, Canada, during the 1764–1766 survey of Samuel Holland.

It contains the following townships:

 Lot 18
 Lot 19
 Lot 25
 Lot 26
 Lot 27
 Lot 28

It also contains Prince Royalty.

Parishes of Prince Edward Island
Geography of Prince County, Prince Edward Island